Mboko (Mboxo) is a Bantu language of the Republic of the Congo.

References

 
Mboshi languages
Languages of the Republic of the Congo